Roberts Stadium is the name of several stadiums in the United States: 
M. M. Roberts Stadium in Hattiesburg, Mississippi as part of the University of Southern Mississippi's campus
Roberts Municipal Stadium, a defunct indoor arena located in Evansville, Indiana.
Lanphier Park, also known as Robin Roberts Stadium at Lanphier Park,  Springfield, Illinois, USA
Roberts Stadium (Soccer stadium), an outdoor soccer stadium at Princeton University